Mašín is a Czech surname, derived from the given name Mašín, which is a pet form of Matěj, a variant of Matthew. It can also be used as Masin. The surname may refer to:

Ctirad Mašín (1930–2011), Czech resistance fighter
Draga Mašin (1864–1903), Queen of Serbia
Gwendolyn Masin (born 1977), Dutch violinist
Josef Mašín (1896–1942), Czech general
Josef Mašín (born 1932), Czech resistance fighter
Arnold Masin (born 1977), Polish politician
George Masin (born 1947), American fencer
Lucila Masin (born 1984), Argentine politician
Sandra Masin (born 1942), American politician

See also 
 Masin (disambiguation)

References

Czech-language surnames
Surnames of Czech origin